The 2010–11 Portland Trail Blazers season was the 41st season of the franchise in the National Basketball Association (NBA).

In the playoffs, the Trail Blazers lost to the eventual NBA champion Dallas Mavericks in six games in the First Round.

Key dates
 June 24 – The 2010 NBA draft in New York City
 June 24 – Kevin Pritchard is relieved of his duties as general manager by owner Paul Allen.
 July 1 – The free agency negotiation period begins
 July 8 – First day NBA free agents can sign new contracts; Prior conditional free agent trades can be finalized
 July 16 – First round draft picks become free agents if not given a required tender
 July 19 – Rich Cho hired as general manager
 July 23 – Last day to withdraw a qualifying offer to a restricted free agent without the player's consent
 July 19 – Bernie Bickerstaff, Bob Ociepka, and Buck Williams hired as assistant coaches
 August 15 – Players waived on or after this date remain on waivers for 48 hours
 September 6 – Second round draft picks become free agents if not given a required tender
 October 1 – Last day to sign replacement player with Disabled Player exception if the player was injured from December 1 to June 30 and will be out for the season
 November 1 – Last day to exercise option years on scale contracts; Last day contracts can be extended
 December 15 – Players who signed a contract on or before September 15 can be traded

Offseason

NBA Draft

Free agency

Roster

Salaries

As of October 26, 2010:

Sources:
 HoopsWorld: Blazers Salaries
 HoopsWorld: 2010–11 NBA Rookie Scale

Pre-season

Game log

|- bgcolor="#ccffcc"
| 1
| October 5
| L.A. Clippers
| 
| Wesley Matthews (20)
| LaMarcus Aldridge (7)
| Andre Miller (5)
| Rose Garden18,209
| 1–0
|- bgcolor="#ffcccc"
| 2
| October 7
| @ Utah
| 
| Wesley Matthews (21)
| Dante Cunningham (10)
| Wesley Matthews (5)
| EnergySolutions Arena19,492
| 1–1
|- bgcolor="#ffcccc"
| 3
| October 8
| @ Denver
| 
| Luke Babbitt (18)
| Dante Cunningham (10)
| Andre Miller (7)
| Pepsi Center10,864
| 1–2
|- bgcolor="#ffcccc"
| 4
| October 11
| Utah
| 
| LaMarcus Aldridge (22)
| Marcus Camby (7)
| Andre Miller (4)
| Portland Memorial Coliseum10,651
| 1–3
|- bgcolor="#ccffcc"
| 5
| October 16
| Golden State
| 
| LaMarcus Aldridge (25)
| Nicolas Batum (9)
| Brandon Roy,Rudy Fernández (5)
| Rose Garden19,727
| 2–3
|- bgcolor="#ffcccc"
| 6
| October 18
| @ Golden State
| 
| LaMarcus Aldridge (11)
| Luke Babbitt (9)
| Luke Babbitt (5)
| Oracle Arena11,246
| 2–4
|- bgcolor="#ccffcc"
| 7
| October 21
| Denver
| 
| Brandon Roy (23)
| Marcus Camby (17)
| Andre Miller (7)
| Rose Garden19,710
| 3–4
|-

Regular season

Standings

Record vs. opponents

Game log

|- bgcolor="#ccffcc"
| 1
| October 26
| Phoenix
| 
| Brandon Roy (24)
| Nicolas Batum (11)
| Andre Miller (9)
| Rose Garden20,603
| 1–0
|- bgcolor="#ccffcc"
| 2
| October 27                   
| @ L.A. Clippers
| 
| Brandon Roy (22)
| Marcus Camby (14)
| Andre Miller (7)
| Staples Center18,382
| 2–0
|- bgcolor="#ccffcc"
| 3
| October 30
| @ New York
| 
| Brandon Roy (29)
| LaMarcus Aldridge (10)
| Andre Miller (10)
| Madison Square Garden19,763
| 3–0
|-

|- bgcolor="#ffcccc"
| 4
| November 1
| @ Chicago
| 
| LaMarcus Aldridge (33)
| Marcus Camby (11)
| Andre Miller (6)
| United Center21,057
| 3–1
|- bgcolor="#ccffcc"
| 5
| November 2
| @ Milwaukee
| 
| Wesley Matthews (18)
| Marcus Camby (13)
| Andre Miller,Armon Johnson (5)
| Bradley Center13,087
| 4–1
|- bgcolor="#ffcccc"
| 6
| November 4
| Oklahoma City
| 
| LaMarcus Aldridge (22)
| Marcus Camby (12)
| Andre Miller (11)
| Rose Garden20,611
| 4–2
|- bgcolor="#ccffcc"
| 7
| November 6
| Toronto
| 
| Brandon Roy (26)
| Marcus Camby (16)
| Andre Miller (13)
| Rose Garden20,363
| 5–2
|- bgcolor="#ffcccc"
| 8
| November 7
| @ L.A. Lakers
| 
| Andre Miller (20)
| Marcus Camby (7)
| Andre Miller (5)
| Staples Center18,997
| 5–3
|- bgcolor="#ccffcc"
| 9
| November 9
| Detroit
| 
| LaMarcus Aldridge (19)
| LaMarcus Aldridge (17)
| Marcus Camby (6)
| Rose Garden20,556
| 6–3
|- bgcolor="#ffcccc"
| 10
| November 12
| @ Oklahoma City
| 
| Brandon Roy (24)
| Nicolas Batum,Marcus Camby (6)
| Andre Miller (10)
| Oklahoma City Arena18,203
| 6–4
|- bgcolor="#ffcccc"
| 11
| November 13
| @ New Orleans
| 
| Nicolas Batum (16)
| Marcus Camby (12)
| LaMarcus Aldridge (5)
| New Orleans Arena14,706
| 6–5
|- bgcolor="#ccffcc"
| 12
| November 16
| @ Memphis
| 
| Wesley Matthews (30)
| Marcus Camby (17)
| Andre Miller (9)
| FedExForum10,827
| 7–5
|- bgcolor="#ccffcc"
| 13
| November 18
| Denver
| 
| LaMarcus Aldridge (24)
| Marcus Camby (14)
| Andre Miller (6)
| Rose Garden20,532
| 8–5
|- bgcolor="#ffcccc"
| 14
| November 20
| Utah
| 
| LaMarcus Aldridge (24)
| Marcus Camby (14)
| Andre Miller (9)
| Rose Garden20,533
| 8–6
|- bgcolor="#ffcccc"
| 15
| November 26
| New Orleans
| 
| Brandon Roy (27)
| LaMarcus Aldridge (9)
| Andre Miller (6)
| Rose Garden20,452
| 8–7
|- bgcolor="#ffcccc"
| 16
| November 28
| @ New Jersey
| 
| Wesley Matthews (25)
| Marcus Camby (10)
| Andre Miller (5)
| Prudential Center11,448
| 8–8
|- bgcolor="#ffcccc"
| 17
| November 30
| @ Philadelphia
| 
| Wesley Matthews (26)
| LaMarcus Aldridge (12)
| Andre Miller (9)
| Wells Fargo Center13,556
| 8–9
|-

|- bgcolor="#ffcccc"
| 18
| December 1
| @ Boston
| 
| Wesley Matthews (23)
| Marcus Camby (9)
| Andre Miller (6)
| TD Garden18,624
| 8–10
|- bgcolor="#ffcccc"
| 19
| December 3
| @ Washington
| 
| Brandon Roy (18)
| LaMarcus Aldridge (15)
| Patrick Mills (6)
| Verizon Center13,408
| 8–11
|- bgcolor="#ccffcc"
| 20
| December 5
| L.A. Clippers
| 
| Wesley Matthews (26)
| Marcus Camby (19)
| Andre Miller (6)
| Rose Garden20,139
| 9–11
|- bgcolor="#ccffcc"
| 21
| December 7
| Phoenix
| 
| Wesley Matthews (24)
| LaMarcus Aldridge (6)
| Patrick Mills (7)
| Rose Garden20,151
| 10–11
|- bgcolor="#ccffcc"
| 22
| December 9
| Orlando
| 
| Andre Miller (22)
| Marcus Camby (13)
| Andre Miller (8)
| Rose Garden20,219
| 11–11
|- bgcolor="#ccffcc"
| 23
| December 10
| @ Phoenix
| 
| Brandon Roy (26)
| Marcus Camby (18)
| Andre Miller (9)
| US Airways Center17,284
| 12–11
|- bgcolor="#ffcccc"
| 24
| December 12
| @ San Antonio
| 
| Wesley Matthews (17)
| Marcus Camby (13)
| Andre Miller (7)
| AT&T Center16,743
| 12–12
|- bgcolor="#ffcccc"
| 25
| December 13
| @ Memphis
| 
| Wesley Matthews (18)
| Marcus Camby (14)
| Andre Miller (9)
| FedExForum10,467
| 12–13
|- bgcolor="#ffcccc"
| 26
| December 15
| @ Dallas
| 
| LaMarcus Aldridge (35)
| LaMarcus Aldridge (10)
| Andre Miller (8)
| American Airlines Center19,531
| 12–14
|- bgcolor="#ccffcc"
| 27
| December 17
| Minnesota
| 
| LaMarcus Aldridge (36)
| LaMarcus Aldridge (10)
| Rudy Fernández (6)
| Rose Garden20,310
| 13–14
|- bgcolor="#ccffcc"
| 28
| December 18
| Golden State
| 
| LaMarcus Aldridge,Andre Miller (17)
| LaMarcus Aldridge (12)
| Andre Miller (8)
| Rose Garden20,398
| 14–14
|- bgcolor="#ccffcc"
| 29
| December 20
| Milwaukee
| 
| LaMarcus Aldridge (29)
| LaMarcus Aldridge (19)
| Andre Miller (9)
| Rose Garden20,406
| 15–14
|- bgcolor="#ffcccc"
| 30
| December 25
| @ Golden State
| 
| Wesley Matthews (25)
| Marcus Camby (13)
| Andre Miller (15)
| Oracle Arena19,596
| 15–15
|- bgcolor="#ccffcc"
| 31
| December 27
| @ Utah
| 
| LaMarcus Aldridge (26)
| Marcus Camby (12)
| Andre Miller (6)
| EnergySolutions Arena19,911
| 16–15
|- bgcolor="#ffcccc"
| 32
| December 28
| @ Denver
| 
| LaMarcus Aldridge (18)
| LaMarcus Aldridge (13)
| Andre Miller (5)
| Pepsi Center17,388
| 16–16
|- bgcolor="#ccffcc"
| 33
| December 30
| Utah
| 
| Wesley Matthews (30)
| Marcus Camby (20)
| Andre Miller (10)
| Rose Garden20,652
| 17–16
|-

|- bgcolor="#ccffcc"
| 34
| January 2
| Houston
| 
| LaMarcus Aldridge (25)
| Marcus Camby (13)
| Marcus Camby (8)
| Rose Garden20,416
| 18–16
|- bgcolor="#ffcccc"
| 35
| January 4
| @ Dallas
| 
| LaMarcus Aldridge (28)
| Marcus Camby (20)
| Marcus Camby,Patrick Mills (4)
| American Airlines Center19,514
| 18–17
|- bgcolor="#ccffcc"
| 36
| January 5
| @ Houston
| 
| LaMarcus Aldridge (27)
| LaMarcus Aldridge (13)
| Rudy Fernández (5)
| Toyota Center14,125
| 19–17
|- bgcolor="#ccffcc"
| 37
| January 7
| @ Minnesota
| 
| Wesley Matthews (36)
| LaMarcus Aldridge (10)
| Andre Miller (10)
| Target Center12,213
| 20–17
|- bgcolor="#ffcccc"
| 38
| January 9
| Miami
| 
| LaMarcus Aldridge (31)
| LaMarcus Aldridge,Marcus Camby (14)
| LaMarcus Aldridge,Andre Miller (7)
| Rose Garden20,636
| 20–18
|- bgcolor="#ffcccc"
| 39
| January 11
| New York
| 
| LaMarcus Aldridge (19)
| Marcus Camby (16)
| Marcus Camby,Andre Miller (3)
| Rose Garden20,604
| 20–19
|- bgcolor="#ffcccc"
| 40
| January 14
| @ Phoenix
| 
| Wesley Matthews (26)
| Marcus Camby (15)
| Andre Miller (8)
| US Airways Center17,412
| 20–20
|- bgcolor="#ccffcc"
| 41
| January 15
| New Jersey
| 
| LaMarcus Aldridge (27)
| Marcus Camby (10)
| Andre Miller (8)
| Rose Garden20,441
| 21–20
|- bgcolor="#ccffcc"
| 42
| January 17
| Minnesota
| 
| LaMarcus Aldridge (37)
| LaMarcus Aldridge (12)
| Andre Miller (10)
| Rose Garden20,239
| 22–20
|- bgcolor="#ccffcc"
| 43
| January 19
| @ Sacramento
| 
| Nicolas Batum (24)
| Joel Przybilla (11)
| Andre Miller (6)
| ARCO Arena12,722
| 23–20
|- bgcolor="#ccffcc"
| 44
| January 20
| L.A. Clippers
| 
| LaMarcus Aldridge,Wesley Matthews (28)
| LaMarcus Aldridge,Andre Miller (8)
| Andre Miller (7)
| Rose Garden20,630
| 24–20
|- bgcolor="#ccffcc"
| 45
| January 22
| Indiana
| 
| LaMarcus Aldridge (25)
| LaMarcus Aldridge (12)
| Wesley Matthews (9)
| Rose Garden20,563
| 25–20
|- bgcolor="#ffcccc"
| 46
| January 24
| Sacramento
| 
| Wesley Matthews (21)
| Nicolas Batum (9)
| LaMarcus Aldridge,Andre Miller (5)
| Rose Garden20,488
| 25–21
|- bgcolor="#ffcccc"
| 47
| January 27
| Boston
| 
| LaMarcus Aldridge (17)
| LaMarcus Aldridge (16)
| Andre Miller (7)
| Rose Garden20,706
| 25–22
|-

|- bgcolor="#ccffcc"
| 48
| February 1
| San Antonio
| 
| LaMarcus Aldridge (40)
| LaMarcus Aldridge (11)
| Andre Miller (9)
| Rose Garden20,364
| 26–22
|- bgcolor="#ffcccc"
| 49
| February 2
| @ Denver
| 
| Wesley Matthews (19)
| LaMarcus Aldridge (9)
| Andre Miller (10)
| Pepsi Center15,258
| 26–23
|- bgcolor="#ffcccc"
| 50
| February 4
| @ Indiana
| 
| Rudy Fernández (19)
| LaMarcus Aldridge (10)
| Rudy Fernández (5)
| Conseco Fieldhouse11,778
| 26–24
|- bgcolor="#ccffcc"
| 51
| February 5
| @ Cleveland
| 
| Wesley Matthews (31)
| LaMarcus Aldridge (10)
| Andre Miller (13)
| Quicken Loans Arena19,975
| 27–24
|- bgcolor="#ccffcc"
| 52
| February 7
| Chicago
| 
| LaMarcus Aldridge (42)
| LaMarcus Aldridge (8)
| Andre Miller (11)
| Rose Garden20,534
| 28–24
|- bgcolor="#ccffcc"
| 53
| February 11
| @ Toronto
| 
| LaMarcus Aldridge (37)
| LaMarcus Aldridge (10)
| Andre Miller (8)
| Air Canada Centre15,625
| 29–24
|- bgcolor="#ccffcc"
| 54
| February 13
| @ Detroit
| 
| LaMarcus Aldridge (36)
| Wesley Matthews (7)
| Andre Miller (12)
| The Palace of Auburn Hills15,257
| 30–24
|- bgcolor="#ccffcc"
| 55
| February 14
| @ Minnesota
| 
| Wesley Matthews (23)
| Dante Cunningham (13)
| Andre Miller (7)
| Target Center11,227
| 31–24
|- bgcolor="#ccffcc"
| 56
| February 16
| New Orleans
| 
| LaMarcus Aldridge (34)
| Wesley Matthews (8)
| Andre Miller (7)
| Rose Garden20,650
| 32–24
|- align="center"
|colspan="9" bgcolor="#bbcaff"|All-Star Break
|- bgcolor="#ffcccc"
| 57
| February 23
| L.A. Lakers
| 
| LaMarcus Aldridge (29)
| LaMarcus Aldridge (14)
| Andre Miller (8)
| Rose Garden20,643
| 32–25
|- bgcolor="#ccffcc"
| 58
| February 25
| Denver
| 
| LaMarcus Aldridge (24)
| LaMarcus Aldridge (14)
| Andre Miller (9)
| Rose Garden20,659
| 33–25
|- bgcolor="#ffcccc"
| 59
| February 27
| Atlanta
| 
| Andre Miller (20)
| LaMarcus Aldridge (8)
| Andre Miller (4)
| Rose Garden20,642
| 33–26
|-

|- bgcolor="#ffcccc"
| 60
| March 1
| Houston
| 
| Nicolas Batum (22)
| Gerald Wallace (10)
| Andre Miller (6)
| Rose Garden20,272
| 33–27
|- bgcolor="#ccffcc"
| 61
| March 2
| @ Sacramento
| 
| Wesley Matthews (21)
| Marcus Camby (13)
| Andre Miller (6)
| Power Balance Pavilion12,286
| 34–27
|- bgcolor="#ccffcc"
| 62
| March 5
| Charlotte
| 
| LaMarcus Aldridge (26)
| Marcus Camby (10)
| Andre Miller (6)
| Rose Garden20,588
| 35–27
|- bgcolor="#ccffcc"
| 63
| March 7
| @ Orlando
| 
| LaMarcus Aldridge (24)
| Marcus Camby,Gerald Wallace (10)
| Andre Miller (7)
| Amway Center19,001
| 36–27
|- bgcolor="#ccffcc"
| 64
| March 8
| @ Miami
| 
| LaMarcus Aldridge (26)
| Gerald Wallace (9)
| Andre Miller,Wesley Matthews (5)
| American Airlines Arena19,835
| 37–27
|- bgcolor="#ffcccc"
| 65
| March 11
| @ Charlotte
| 
| Wesley Matthews (20)
| Marcus Camby (11)
| Andre Miller (9)
| Time Warner Cable Arena18,176
| 37–28
|- bgcolor="#ffcccc"
| 66
| March 12
| @ Atlanta
| 
| LaMarcus Aldridge (22)
| Gerald Wallace (12)
| LaMarcus Aldridge (7)
| Philips Arena15,522
| 37–29
|- bgcolor="#ccffcc"
| 67
| March 15
| Dallas
| 
| LaMarcus Aldridge (30)
| LaMarcus Aldridge,Marcus Camby (8)
| Nicolas Batum (5)
| Rose Garden20,631
| 38–29
|- bgcolor="#ccffcc"
| 68
| March 17
| Cleveland
| 
| LaMarcus Aldridge (20)
| LaMarcus Aldridge (11)
| Andre Miller,Gerald Wallace (6)
| Rose Garden20,235
| 39–29
|- bgcolor="#ccffcc"
| 69
| March 19
| Philadelphia
| 
| Gerald Wallace (25)
| LaMarcus Aldridge (7)
| Gerald Wallace (8)
| Rose Garden20,637
| 40–29
|- bgcolor="#ffcccc"
| 70
| March 20
| @ L.A. Lakers
| 
| Nicolas Batum (25)
| Marcus Camby (10)
| Andre Miller (5)
| Staples Center18,997
| 40–30
|- bgcolor="#ccffcc"
| 71
| March 22
| Washington
| 
| Gerald Wallace (28)
| Nicolas Batum (12)
| Andre Miller (11)
| Rose Garden20,624
| 41–30
|- bgcolor="#ccffcc"
| 72
| March 25
| San Antonio
| 
| Nicolas Batum,Andre Miller (21)
| Gerald Wallace (10)
| Andre Miller (8)
| Rose Garden20,644
| 42–30
|- bgcolor="#ffcccc"
| 73
| March 27
| @ Oklahoma City
| 
| Gerald Wallace (40)
| Marcus Camby (13)
| Andre Miller (5)
| Oklahoma City Arena18,203
| 42–31
|- bgcolor="#ccffcc"
| 74
| March 28
| @ San Antonio
| 
| Andre Miller (26)
| Nicolas Batum (13)
| Brandon Roy (4)
| AT&T Center18,583
| 43–31
|- bgcolor="#ffcccc"
| 75
| March 30
| @ New Orleans
| 
| LaMarcus Aldridge (24)
| LaMarcus Aldridge (15)
| Andre Miller (5)
| New Orleans Arena12,575
| 43–32
|-

|- bgcolor="#ccffcc"
| 76
| April 1
| Oklahoma City
| 
| LaMarcus Aldridge (32)
| LaMarcus Aldridge (8)
| Andre Miller (7)
| Rose Garden20,709
| 44–32
|- bgcolor="#ccffcc"
| 77
| April 3
| Dallas
| 
| Gerald Wallace (19)
| LaMarcus Aldridge,Gerald Wallace (8)
| Nicolas Batum,Brandon Roy (4)
| Rose Garden20,534
| 45–32
|- bgcolor="#ffcccc"
| 78
| April 5
| Golden State
| 
| LaMarcus Aldridge,Wesley Matthews (17)
| LaMarcus Aldridge (12)
| LaMarcus Aldridge (4)
| Rose Garden20,551
| 45–33
|- bgcolor="#ccffcc"
| 79
| April 7
| @ Utah
| 
| Gerald Wallace (29)
| LaMarcus Aldridge (11)
| Andre Miller (12)
| EnergySolutions Arena18,831
| 46–33
|- bgcolor="#ccffcc"
| 80
| April 8
| L.A. Lakers
| 
| LaMarcus Aldridge (24)
| Gerald Wallace (13)
| Andre Miller (13)
| Rose Garden20,697
| 47–33
|- bgcolor="#ccffcc"
| 81
| April 12
| Memphis
| 
| LaMarcus Aldridge (22)
| LaMarcus Aldridge,Marcus Camby (11)
| Andre Miller (8)
| Rose Garden20,662
| 48–33
|- bgcolor="#ffcccc"
| 82
| April 13
| @ Golden State
| 
| Patrick Mills (23)
| Earl Barron,Chris Johnson (13)
| Rudy Fernández (5)
| Oracle Arena19,596
| 48–34
|-

Playoffs

Game log

|- bgcolor=ffcccc
| 1
| April 16
| @ Dallas
| 
| LaMarcus Aldridge (27)
| Marcus Camby (18)
| Andre Miller (6)
| American Airlines Center20,541
| 0–1
|- bgcolor=ffcccc
| 2
| April 19
| @ Dallas
| 
| LaMarcus Aldridge (24)
| LaMarcus Aldridge (10)
| Andre Miller (8)
| American Airlines Center20,620
| 0–2
|- bgcolor=ccffcc
| 3
| April 21
| Dallas
| 
| Wesley Matthews (25)
| Gerald Wallace (11)
| Andre Miller (7)
| Rose Garden20,217
| 1–2
|- bgcolor=ccffcc
| 4
| April 23
| Dallas
| 
| Brandon Roy (24)
| Gerald Wallace (11)
| Brandon Roy (5)
| Rose Garden20,357
| 2–2
|- bgcolor=ffcccc
| 5
| April 25
| @ Dallas
| 
| Andre Miller (18)
| LaMarcus Aldridge,Gerald Wallace (9)
| Andre Miller (7)
| American Airlines Center20,837
| 2–3
|- bgcolor=ffcccc
| 6
| April 28
| Dallas
| 
| Gerald Wallace (32)
| Gerald Wallace (12)
| Andre Miller (4)
| Rose Garden20,494
| 2–4
|-

Player statistics

Season

|- align="center" bgcolor=""
|  || style="background:#D1210A;color:black;" | 81 || style="background:#D1210A;color:black;" | 81 || style="background:#D1210A;color:black;" | 39.6 || .500 || .174 || .791 || 8.8 || 2.1 || 1.01 || 1.16 || style="background:#D1210A;color:black;" | 21.8
|- align="center" bgcolor="#f0f0f0"
|  || 23 || 0 || 4.5 || .289 || .091 || .286 || 0.8 || 0.1 || .09 || .09 || 1.1
|- align="center" bgcolor=""
| * || 1 || 0 || 1.0 || style="background:#D1210A;color:black;" | 1.000 || .0 || .0 || 1.0 || 0.0 || .0 || .0 || 2.0
|- align="center" bgcolor="#f0f0f0"
|  || 80 || 67 || 31.5 || .455 || .345 || .841 || 4.5 || 1.5 || .85 || .61 || 12.4
|- align="center" bgcolor=""
|  || 59 || 51 || 26.1 || .398 || .000 || .614 || style="background:#D1210A;color:black;" | 10.3 || 2.1 || .68 || style="background:#D1210A;color:black;" | 1.56 || 4.7
|- align="center" bgcolor="#f0f0f0"
| * || 5 || 0 || 4.8 || .167 || .0 || .0 || 1.4 || 0.2 || .0 || .0 || 0.4
|- align="center" bgcolor=""
| * || 56 || 9 || 19.8 || .433 || .000 || .711 || 3.4 || 0.5 || .70 || .57 || 5.1
|- align="center" bgcolor="#f0f0f0"
|  || 77 || 2 || 23.2 || .372 || .323 || style="background:#D1210A;color:black;" | .863 || 2.2 || 2.4 || 1.12 || .18 || 8.6
|- align="center" bgcolor=""
|  || 37 || 0 || 6.6 || .461 || style="background:#D1210A;color:black;" | .455 || .579 || 0.9 || 1.1 || .08 || .03 || 2.6
|- align="center" bgcolor="#f0f0f0"
| * || 9 || 0 || 7.3 || .600 || .0 || .700 || 1.6 || 0.1 || .22 || .56 || 2.1
|- align="center" bgcolor=""
|  || 29 || 0 || 7.2 || .432 || 1.000 || .625 || 1.4 || 0.1 || .14 || .10 || 1.6
|- align="center" bgcolor="#f0f0f0"
|  || style="background:#D1210A;color:black;" | 81 || 68 || 33.8 || .448 || .404 || .842 || 3.2 || 2.0 || 1.26 || .11 || 15.8
|- align="center" bgcolor=""
|  || 80 || 80 || 33.0 || .459 || .111 || .853 || 3.8 || style="background:#D1210A;color:black;" | 7.1 || 1.43 || .15 || 12.8
|- align="center" bgcolor="#f0f0f0"
|  || 64 || 0 || 12.2 || .412 || .353 || .766 || 0.8 || 1.7 || .40 || 1.0 || 5.5
|- align="center" bgcolor=""
|  || 5 || 0 || 9.0 || .600 || .0 || .500 || 1.4 || 0.0 || .0 || .0 || 1.4
|- align="center" bgcolor="#f0f0f0"
| * || 31 || 9 || 14.4 || .618 || .0 || .565 || 3.9 || 0.4 || .16 || .45 || 1.8
|- align="center" bgcolor=""
|  || 47 || 23 || 27.9 || .400 || .333 || .848 || 2.6 || 2.7 || .79 || .26 || 12.2
|- align="center" bgcolor="#f0f0f0"
| * || 23 || 15 || 35.7 || .498 || .338 || .767 || 7.6 || 2.5 || style="background:#D1210A;color:black;" | 2.00 || .65 || 15.8
|}
As of April 12.
* – Stats with the Blazers.

Playoffs

Awards, records and milestones

Awards

Weekly and  monthly
 Western Conference Player of the Week
 January 17–23, 2011 – LaMarcus Aldridge
 February 7–13, 2011 – LaMarcus Aldridge
 Western Conference Player of the Month
 February 2011 – LaMarcus Aldridge

All-Star
 NBA All-Star Weekend Rookie Challenge – Wesley Matthews

Season

Records

Milestones

Injuries and surgeries
 December 5, 2009: Greg Oden – broken left patella (suffered in 2009–10 season)
 December 22, 2009: Joel Przybilla – dislocated right patella and ruptured patellar tendon (suffered in 2009–10 season)
 November 4, 2010: Elliot Williams – dislocated right patella; out for season

Transactions

Trades

Free agents

Additions

Subtractions

References

Portland Trail Blazers seasons
Portland
Portland Trail Blazers 2010
Portland Trail Blazers 2010
Port
Port